Shane Moroney (born February 4, 1989, in Pensacola, Florida) is an American soccer player.

Career

College and Amateur
Moroney grew up in Peachtree City, Georgia, attended Starr's Mill High School and played club soccer for the Capital City Streaks in Montgomery, Alabama, before going on to play four years of college soccer at Berry College. Maroney was a second team All-Conference and a SSAC All-Academic Team selection at Berry as a sophomore in 2008.

Professional
Moroney turned professional in 2011 when he signed with Atlanta Silverbacks of the North American Soccer League. He made his professional debut on April 9, 2011, in a game against the NSC Minnesota Stars Atlanta announced on November 8, 2011, that Moroney would return for the 2012 season.

References

External links
Atlanta Silverbacks bio
InfoSport profile

1989 births
Living people
People from Peachtree City, Georgia
Sportspeople from the Atlanta metropolitan area
Sportspeople from Pensacola, Florida
American soccer players
Association football defenders
Atlanta Silverbacks players
North American Soccer League players